Michael Thomas Furrey (born May 12, 1977) is a former American football wide receiver and safety who is currently the head coach of the Limestone Saints. This is Furrey's second stint as Limestone's head coach following his two seasons with the team in 2016. He was signed by the Indianapolis Colts as an undrafted free agent in 2000. He played college football at Northern Iowa and Ohio State University.

Furrey was also a member of the New York Dragons, Las Vegas Outlaws, St. Louis Rams, Detroit Lions, Cleveland Browns, and Washington Redskins.

Early years
Furrey attended Hilliard Davidson High School in Hilliard, Ohio, and was a letter-winner in football, basketball, and baseball. In football, as a senior, he was a first-team All-District honoree a first-team All-Conference honoree, and a first-team All-Ohio honoree.

College career
After high school, Furrey enrolled at Ohio State University in 1995, where he played in nine games as a freshman walk-on. In 1996, he transferred to Division I-AA Northern Iowa. In his three years at UNI, Furrey set new Gateway Football Conference receiving records with career totals of 242 receptions for 3,544 yards and 27 touchdowns.

Professional career

Indianapolis Colts
He entered the NFL as an undrafted free agent for the Indianapolis Colts in 2000 but was waived at the end of training camp.

Las Vegas Outlaws
He went on to play in the XFL for the Las Vegas Outlaws. He finished the season with 18 receptions for 243 yards and one touchdown.

New York Dragons
Furrey played for the New York Dragons in 2002 and 2003 as a Wide receiver/Defensive back. He was leading the Arena Football League in receptions (108), receiving yards (1,574), receiving touchdowns (46, tying an AFL record for touchdowns in a single season), and points (288) when he left the Dragons on April 29, 2003 to sign with the St. Louis Rams of the National Football League.

St. Louis Rams
Furrey made the 2003 Rams roster and played in 13 games, serving as wide receiver and special teams ace. He played in eight games and two playoff contests in 2004. Due to a lack of depth in the Rams' secondary before the 2005 season, Furrey converted to free safety based on his experience in the AFL, where players play both offense and defense. He became the starter in Week 5. He was successful in the transition, as he had one game-winning interception 67-yard return for a touchdown, and the next week a game-clinching interception in the closing minutes of the fourth quarter. At the end of the 2005 season, Furrey was released.

Detroit Lions
The Detroit Lions signed Furrey to a one-year deal on April 4, 2006 as a wide receiver, being one of the few active players in the NFL to have started on both offense and defense. He emerged as a solid option in the Lions offense, catching 98 passes for 1,086 yards and six touchdowns. His 98 receptions for that season were the most for any player in the conference, and second best in the league.

On December 31, 2006, Furrey set the pro football record for most catches for a non-rookie after a season with no catches the previous season. He had 98 receptions at the end of the 2006 season (which was the most in the NFC for that year), after none in 2005. The previous record was 92 catches, set in 1960 by Lionel Taylor, playing for Denver in the AFL.

Furrey was the 2006 recipient of the Detroit Lions/Detroit Sports Broadcasters Association/Pro Football Writers Association's Media-Friendly "Good Guy" Award. The Good Guy Award is given yearly to the Detroit Lions player who shows consideration to, and cooperation with the media at all times during the course of the season.

After the 2006 season, Furrey was re-signed by the Lions to a three-year contract due to his breakout year. In the 2007 NFL Draft the Lions selected wide receiver Calvin Johnson in the first round (2nd overall), making Furrey number three on the depth chart. Furrey recorded 61 catches for 664 yards in 2007. He was re-signed as an unrestricted free agent on January 24, 2007.  Furrey was released by the Lions on February 9, 2009.

Cleveland Browns
Furrey was signed by the Cleveland Browns on May 5, 2009. Furrey started the year at wide receiver for the Browns, but was moved to free safety and nickelback due to the lack of depth in Cleveland's injury-depleted secondary. In 2010, he was one of three finalists for the Walter Payton Man of the Year Award, which Brian Waters ultimately won. He was also the Browns' 2009 Ed Block Courage Award Recipient.

Washington Redskins
Furrey was signed by the Washington Redskins on June 9, 2010.

After football
In August 2011 it was announced Furrey was one of a number of former NFL players suing the NFL over concussions and related symptoms.

Coaching career
On December 10, 2010, Furrey was introduced as the head football coach at Kentucky Christian University in Grayson, Kentucky.  KCU plays in the Mid-South Conference of the National Association of Intercollegiate Athletics (NAIA). On February 20, 2013, Furrey resigned his position as KCU head coach to become wide receivers coach at Marshall University.  On May 10, 2016, it was reported that Furrey would be leaving Marshall University to become the head coach at Limestone College.  On May 12, 2016, Furrey was introduced at Limestone College in Gaffney, South Carolina at a press conference.  He became the second head coach for football for the Limestone Saints, compiling a 9–12 record in two seasons with the team.

Furrey joined the Chicago Bears as their wide receivers coach on January 12, 2018, reuniting with New York Dragons teammate and new Bears head coach Matt Nagy. Following Nagy's firing after the 2021 season, Furrey was not retained by the team.

References

External links
 Limestone profile
 Kentucky Christian profile
 Marshall profile

1977 births
Living people
American football safeties
American football wide receivers
Cleveland Browns players
Detroit Lions players
Indianapolis Colts players
Kentucky Christian Knights football coaches
Las Vegas Outlaws (XFL) players
Limestone Saints football coaches
Marshall Thundering Herd football coaches
New York Dragons players
Northern Iowa Panthers football players
Ohio State Buckeyes football players
St. Louis Rams players
Washington Redskins players
Chicago Bears coaches
People from Franklin County, Ohio
People from Galion, Ohio
Players of American football from Ohio
Ed Block Courage Award recipients